"Shame" is a 1977 single recorded by American singer Evelyn "Champagne" King, written by John H. Fitch Jr. and Reuben Cross, and released by RCA Records. It was released by RCA Records as part of King's debut album, Smooth Talk. The extended remix was produced for the twelve-inch vinyl single and would later replace the album version of the song in late-1970s reprints of the album. "Shame" was successful on Billboard music charts and would become one of King's signature songs, though it varied on international music charts. The song was covered by Zhané for the 1994 film A Low Down Dirty Shame and Kim Wilde in 1996.

Recordings
The song "Shame" was released as part of King's 1977 album Smooth Talk and lasts four minutes and thirty-eight seconds. The album version opens with a saxophone note by Sam Peake and is "more concise." Scotty Miller played the drums, and Instant Funk member Raymond Earl played the bass. Al Garrison and David Todd produced the extended remix for the twelve-inch vinyl single, which lasts around six minutes and thirty-five seconds, two minutes longer than the album version, and would replace the album version of the song in late-1970s vinyl re-releases of the album. The extended remix rearranges the drum notes to "[emphasize] the beat more" and widened the drum and bass sounds. The song was remixed twice: once by Enzo Bertoni as "Shame '92", and once by producer Tommy Faragher as "Shame '95 (Tommy Faragher Remix)" for King's 1995 album, I'll Keep a Light On.

Chart performance
The twelve-inch remix vinyl release reached number eight on Billboard Disco Action in January 1978. This release also stayed at number five, its peak position, on Canada's RPM Dance/Urban chart for two weeks until the week ending April 29, 1978.

The song entered the Billboard Hot 100 at number eighty-seven on the week ending June 17, 1978; it peaked at number nine on the week ending September 9 that year. It also reached number seven on Hot Soul Singles on the week ending July 1. The song earned a Gold certification by the RIAA on August 11, 1978. In the Billboard Year End Charts of 1978, the song positioned on number sixty-four on the Year-End Hot 100, number twenty-seven on the Year-End Disco singles chart, and number twenty-six on the Year-End Soul Singles. It also peaked at number eight on the Cash Box Top 100.

It entered Canada's RPM Top 100 Singles chart at number one hundred on the week ending June 24 the same year and stayed at number sixteen, its peak position, for two weeks in September 1978. It positioned on number 111 in the RPM year-end Top 200 Singles.

In the UK Singles Chart, the song spent twenty-three weeks in the chart but only one week in the top 40, peaking at number thirty-nine. In the Netherlands, it peaked at number eighteen for two weeks on the Dutch Top 40 chart and number twenty-six on the Single Top 100. It reached number twelve on Belgian Ultratop Top 50 Singles.

Legacy
King's version is featured in the 2002 video game Grand Theft Auto: Vice City on the in-game radio station Fever 105 and also as part of the soundtrack Grand Theft Auto: Vice City, Vol. 6: Fever 105.

To this date, "Shame" remains one of King's signature songs.

Track listings

7" vinyl single
 "Shame" – 2:53 or 2:55
 "Dancin' Dancin' Dancin'" – 2:51

12" vinyl single (A)
 "Shame" – 6:35
 "Nobody Knows" – 4:31

12" vinyl single (B)
 "Shame" – 6:35
 "Dancin' Dancin' Dancin'" – 4:12

Credits and personnel
 Evelyn "Champagne" King – vocals
 Sam Peake – saxophone
 Theodore Life – producer, arrangement
 Warren Schatz – executive producer
 Scotty Miller – drums
 Raymond Earl – bass
 Al Garrison and David Todd – producers (12" remix only)

Charts and certifications

Weekly charts

Year-end charts

Certifications

Zhané version

In 1994, R&B/hip-hop soul duo Zhané covered the song, produced by Mike Chapman and Trent Thomas, and released by Jive Records and Hollywood Records as part of the soundtrack for the 1994 film A Low Down Dirty Shame. In the US Billboard charts, the rendition reached number twenty-eight on the Hot 100, number thirty-one on the Hot 100 Airplay, number thirty-eight on the Mainstream Top 40, number forty-six on the Hot Dance Club Songs, number thirteen on the Hot R&B/Hip-Hop Airplay, and number nine on the Top 40/Rhythm-Crossover.

This version reached number sixty-six on the UK Singles Chart. It was charted for one week in February 1995 on the New Zealand Singles Chart, peaking at number fifty.

Critic David Browne in an Entertainment Weekly article praised this version as one of the film soundtrack's "moments"; he graded the soundtrack a "B−".

The music video of the Zhané version shows the duo performing the song and scenes from the film.

Track listings

US CD single
 "Shame" (LP Version) – 4:14
 "Shame" (The Bump Mix, featuring Whitey Don) – 4:31
 "Shame" (Club Version) – 6:41
 "Shame" (The Bump Club Version, featuring Whitey Don) – 4:36
 "Shame" (Club Dub) – 6:00
 Zhané Flavor – 5:01 "Interlude""You're Sorry Now""La La La""Love Me Today""Changes""Off My Mind/Outro"

US 12" vinyl single

Side A
 "Shame" (LP Version) – 4:14
 "Shame" (The Bump Mix, featuring Whitey Don) – 4:31
 "Shame" (The Bump Club Version, featuring Whitey Don) – 4:36
Side B
 "Shame" (Club Version) – 6:41
 "Shame" (Club Dub) – 6:00

European CD single
 "Shame" (LP Version) – 4:14
 "Shame" (The Bump Radio Mix, featuring Whitey Don) – 4:31
 "Shame" (Club Version) – 6:41
 "Shame" (The Bump Club Version, featuring Whitey Don) – 4:36
 "Shame" (Bump Radio) – 4:11
 "Shame" (UK Flavour Extended) – 5:06

UK CD single
 "Shame" (LP Version) – 4:14
 "Shame" (The Bump Radio Mix, featuring Whitey Don) – 4:11
 "Shame" (UK Flavour) – 4:37
 "Shame" (Club Version) – 6:41
 "Shame" (UK Flavour Extended) – 5:06
 "Shame" (The Bump Club Version, featuring Whitey Don) – 4:36

UK 12" vinyl single

Side A
 "Shame" (LP Version) – 4:13
 "Shame" (The Bump Mix, featuring Whitey Don) – 4:36
 "Shame" (Club Version) – 6:41
Side B
 "Shame" (UK Flavour Extended) – 5:06
 "Shame" (UK Flavour Instrumental) – 4:37

UK cassette single
 "Shame" (LP Version) – 4:13
 "Shame" (UK Flavour) – 4:37

Charts

Kim Wilde version

The song was covered in 1996 by British singer Kim Wilde. She originally recorded the song as a "new" track on the compilation album The Singles Collection, which was released only in France (not to be confused with the internationally released compilation The Singles Collection 1981–1993 three years prior to this). Wilde's version was released as a single in France and was remixed and released in the United Kingdom. Several extended remixes were also made available in the UK on the 12" and CD-single formats.

The version was charted for one week on the UK Singles Chart, peaking at No. 79.

Critical reception
British magazine Music Week rated Wilde's cover of "Shame" three out of five, adding, "Due out the day after Wilde weds Tommy co-star Hal Fowler, this is a fine but unspectacular updating of the Seventies disco classic."

Music video
The accompanying music video of "Shame" shows Wilde performing the song in various scenes, including those with four male dancers.

Track listings

UK CD single
 "Shame" (Jupiter's Radio Mix) – 3:18
 "Shame" (Matt Darey's Vocal Mix) – 7:12
 "Shame" (T-Empo's Club Mix) – 9:01
 "Hypnotise" (album version) – 4:49

UK 12-inch vinyl single

Side one
 "Shame" (Jupiter's 12" Mix) – 7:11
 "Shame" (Matt Darey's Vocal Mix) – 7:12
 "Shame" (T-Empo's Club Mix) – 9:01
Side two
 "Shame" (T-Empo's Dub Mix) – 7:09
 "Shame" (Matt Darey Dub) – 6:43

UK cassette single (same tracklist in both sides)
 "Shame" (Jupiter's Radio Mix) – 3:18
 "Hypnotise" (album version) – 4:49

France CD single (A)
 "Shame" (Jupiter's Radio Mix) – 3:18
 "Shame" (original radio edit) – 3:37

France CD single (B)
 "Shame" – 3:37
 "If I Can't Have You"

Charts

Notes

References

External links
 [ Evelyn "Champagne" discography at Billboard.com]
 

1978 singles
Evelyn "Champagne" King songs
Funk ballads
1996 singles
RCA Records singles
Kim Wilde songs
1978 songs
Zhané songs
1970s ballads